Autonomism is a political doctrine which supports acquiring or preserving political autonomy of a nation or a region. It is not necessarily opposed to federalism, and souverainism necessarily implies autonomism, but not vice versa.

Examples of autonomist parties include Union Nationale, Action démocratique du Québec and its successor Coalition Avenir Québec (Quebec) and recent (2018) Freedom Conservative Party of Alberta (Alberta) in Canada, New Macau Association in China (Macau), Parti progressiste martiniquais (Martinique) in France, Scottish National Party in the United Kingdom (Scotland), Lega Nord in Italy (Northern Italy) and Popular Democratic Party in the United States (Puerto Rico).

Canada

Alberta 
In Alberta, the Freedom Conservative Party of Alberta (FCPoA), which was formerly known as Alberta First Party (AFP), Western Freedom Party (WFP), and Separation Party (SP), replaced the party's old ideology Albertan separatism to support promoting Albertan autonomy like Quebec's counterparts, instead as part of the new another changes under then elected Derek Fildebrandt's leadership.

Quebec 

Autonomism is a policy defended by four Quebec political parties, the Union Nationale (UN), the Action démocratique du Québec (ADQ), its successor Coalition Avenir Québec (CAQ) and the Équipe Autonomiste (EA), are provincial parties that aim to obtain certain federal capacities and to give the title of autonomous state to the province.

Romania
Székely autonomy movement which is supported by local parties representing the Hungarian community and supported most of the political parties in Hungary.

Spain 
The Autonomous Communities of Spain may demonstrate the doctrine although it is limited in its extent.

Switzerland 
The 26 cantons of Switzerland demonstrate autonomism in a federal state. The Swiss Federal Constitution declares the cantons to be sovereign to the extent that it is not limited by federal law. The cantons also retain all powers and competencies not delegated to the federal government by the Constitution.

See also 
 Localism in Hong Kong
 Regionalism (politics)

References 

Political terminology
Autonomy